Eucolpius or Encolpius was an Ancient Roman writer of the third century. He is named by Lampridius as the author of a life of the emperor Alexander Severus, with whom he lived upon terms of intimacy.

A book published by Thomas Elyot, a man celebrated for his learning in the reign of Henry VIII, under the title "The Image of Governance (Imago Imperii) compiled of the Actes and Sentences notable of the most noble emperor Alexander Severus, translated from the Greek of Eucolpius (Encolpius) into English" was likely a fabrication.

References

Citations

Bibliography
 

3rd-century Romans
3rd-century Latin writers
Ancient Roman writers